Sard Underground (stylized in all caps) is a Japanese musical group under the Giza Studio label. In September 2019, they debuted with their cover album Zard Tribute. As a cover band of the Japanese artist Zard, their name is derived from Zard.

History

2019: Band formation and "Zard Tribute" album
The band formation has started in the December 2018 by introducing only Yua herself with the social network accounts creation.

In February, the band has announced 4 stable members and soon held first one-man live in the live venue Hills Pankojo Factory in Osaka.

In June, two cover songs has received a promotion: My Friend was promoted as an image song to the marathon event Tohoku Miyagi Revive and Makenaide as a theme song to the High School Basketball Winter Cup.

Both of the songs were included in the cover album Zard Tribute, which released on 18 September. The album debuted at number 24 on the Oricon Album Weekly Charts and charted 10 weeks.

In November, they appeared in the music event DFT presents Ototo ONTO vol.6.

2020: Debut single "Sukoshi Zutsu Sukoshi Zutsu"
On February 10, the twenty-ninth anniversary of Zard's first single "Good-bye My Loneliness", the band released their debut single "Sukoshi Zutsu Sukoshi Zutsu." It is an unreleased song written by Zard vocalist Izumi Sakai and composed by frequent Zard collaborator Aika Ohno. The single was used as an ending theme to the anime television series Detective Conan, which featured many Zard songs from 1999 to 2008. A cover of Zard's first single and its B side "Ai wa Kurayami no Naka de" were also included on the regular and Detective Conan editions of the single, respectively.

On June 3, the band released their second single "Korekara no Kimi ni Kampai," another unreleased song written by Sakai. It was composed by another frequest Zard collaborator, Daria Kawashima. The song was featured as the theme song of MBS's music television program +music. The single also included two new covers of Zard songs.

2021: Asaka Miyuu leaves Sard Underground
On May 26, 2021, via Sard Underground's office site it was announced that guitarist Asaka Miyuu had departed Sard Underground and her exclusive contract had been cancelled.  After a doctor's diagnosis it was decided it would be difficult for her to continue her activities as a member of the band and she withdrew. The departure of Miyuu also pushed back the release of the original album "At the end of summer..." to an undetermined future date.

Members
  - vocals
  - bass guitar backing vocals
  - keyboard, backing vocals

Past member 

  -  guitar, backing vocals

Discography

Singles

Albums

References

External links
Sard official Web site 
Sard Official YouTube channel 
 	

Being Inc. artists
Japanese rock music groups
All-female tribute bands
Anime musical groups
Musical groups established in 2018
2018 establishments in Japan